Loïc Puyo (born 19 December 1988) is a French professional footballer who plays as a midfielder for NPL NSW club Rockdale Ilinden.

Career
A former captain of Orléans at under-16 level, Puyo joined Auxerre in July 2005. He moved to Ligue 2 side Amiens in June 2011.

Puyo left Nancy at the end of the 2016–17 season, when his contract expired.

Puyo signed with A-League club Macarthur FC in October 2020.

On 1 February 2022, Puyo joined Chambly until the end of the season.

On 2 February 2023, Poic signed for Rockdale Ilinden for the 2023 NPL NSW season.

References

External links

Loïc Puyo foot-national.com Profile

1988 births
Living people
Footballers from Orléans
French footballers
Association football midfielders
Ligue 1 players
Ligue 2 players
Championnat National players
Championnat National 2 players
A-League Men players
US Orléans players
Amiens SC players
AS Nancy Lorraine players
Angers SCO players
Red Star F.C. players
Macarthur FC players
FC Chambly Oise players
Rockdale Ilinden FC players
French expatriate footballers
Expatriate soccer players in Australia
French expatriate sportspeople in Australia